Jianghanichthys is an extinct genus of cypriniform fish. It is also known as Osteochilus or Chan Han Fish.

Taxonomy
There are still disagreements as to the scientific classification, name and age of this species. However the body shape of Jianghanichthys differs from that of all Amyzon species. It has been suggested that the family Jianghanichthyidae, which is the most basal family of the Cypriniformes, be raised to house this species.

Etymology
The genus name "Jianghanichthys" derives from "Jianghan", the place where it's found, and "ichthys" derives from the Greek word for 'fish'.

Distribution
These fishes lived in the Palaeocene epoch (55 Ma to 65 Ma). Fossils of Jianghanichthys have been found in Hubei, China. 

These fossils are quite common and can be found in most shops.

References
 Organism Names
 Enciclopaedia of Life
 Fish, Reptilia & Mammalia. Biostratigraphy of the Yangtze Gorge area. Volume 5. Cretaceous and Tertiary., Geological Publishing House, Beijing, 1987: 133–187. Chapter pagination: 187–200. Zoological Record Volume 127
 Juan Liu, Mee-mann Chang A new Eocene catostomid (Teleostei: Cypriniformes) from northeastern China and early divergence of Catostomidae
 Universal Biological Indexer
 LIU Juan, TSENG Zhijie J., WILSON Mark V., MURRAY Alison M. - ASIAN FOSSIL CATOSTOMIDS AND ONTOGENETC CHANGE IN EARLY CYPRINIFORMS

Specific

Prehistoric ray-finned fish genera